Şahkərəm or Shahkaram or Shahkerem may refer to:

 Şahkərəm, Dashkasan, a village in the Dashkasan District of Azerbaijan
 Şahkərəm, Kalbajar, a village in the Kalbajar District of Azerbaijan
 Shahkaram, Isfahan, Iran